Randle Cotgrave was an English lexicographer. In 1611 he compiled and published A Dictionarie of the French and English Tongues, a bilingual dictionary that represented a breakthrough at the time and remains historically important.

Life and work

Born into a Cheshire family, Cotgrave may possibly be Randal, son of William Cotgreve of Christleton in Cheshire (died c. 1634), who is mentioned in a pedigree of the Cotgreve family in Harley MS 1500, fol. 118. He was educated at Cambridge University, entering St John's College, Cambridge, on the Lady Margaret foundation, on 10 November 1587. He later became secretary to William Cecil, Lord Burghley, eldest son of Thomas, first earl of Exeter. In dedicating to Burghley his French–English dictionary, Cotgrave says that to his patron's favour he owes "all that he is or has been for many years," and thanks him for his kindness in "so often dispensing with the ordinary assistance of an ordinary servant." The dictionary first appeared in 1611. It includes many French proverbs, some English equivalents, and a few in Latin.

A second edition was published in 1632 together with an English-French dictionary by Robert Sherwood. Later editions revised and enlarged by James Howell appeared in 1650, 1660 and 1673. The author presented a copy of the first edition to Henry Frederick, Prince of Wales, eldest son of James I, and received from him a gift of ten pounds. Cotgrave's dictionary, though not free of ludicrous mistakes, was for its time an unusually careful and intelligent piece of lexicography, still referred to by students of English and of French philology. Two autograph letters of Cotgrave are extant, addressed to M. Beaulieu, secretary to the British ambassador at Paris. The first, dated 27 November 1610, relates to the progress being made with printing his dictionary, saying he had received valuable help from Beaulieu himself and from a Mr Limery. The other letter, states that he has sent his correspondent two copies of his book and requests payment of twenty-two shillings, "which they cost me, who have not been provident enough to reserve any of them, and therefore am forced to be beholden for them to a base and mechanicall generation, that suffers no respect to weigh down a private gain." Thus it appears that Cotgrave was still in Lord Burghley's service.

If he is the same as the "Randal Cotgreve" of the Harleian MS, he later became registrar to the Bishop of Chester and married Ellinor Taylor of that city, by whom he had four sons, William, Randolf, Robert and Alexander, and a daughter Mary. The 1632 edition of the dictionary was evidently taken through the press by the author, the year of whose death is given in Cooper's "Memorials of Cambridge" as 1634. In fact he died in 1652 and was buried at St Bartholomew the Great church, London, on 21 March.

Notes

External links
A Dictionarie of the French and English Tongues - Scans of the original 1611 printing.
Proverbs in Cotgrave

References

British lexicographers
1634 deaths
Year of birth missing
Alumni of St John's College, Cambridge